Fred Perry and Dorothy Round successfully defended their title, defeating Don Budge and Sarah Fabyan in the final, 7–9, 7–5, 6–4 to win the mixed doubles tennis title at the 1936 Wimbledon Championships.

Seeds

  Fred Perry /  Dorothy Round (champions)
  Don Budge /  Sarah Fabyan (final)
  Jean Borotra /  Susan Noel (fourth round)
  Cam Malfroy /  Hilde Sperling (semifinals)

Draw

Finals

Top half

Section 1

Section 2

Section 3

Section 4

Bottom half

Section 5

Section 6

The nationality of Mrs JC Bouch is unknown.

Section 7

Section 8

References

External links

X=Mixed Doubles
Wimbledon Championship by year – Mixed doubles